The 2007 Jacksonville Jaguars season was the franchise's thirteenth season in the National Football League and the fifth under head coach Jack Del Rio. They improved upon their 8–8 record from 2006 when they finished third in the AFC South, and returned to the playoffs for the first time since 2005.

The franchise would miss the playoffs for the next nine seasons, only returning to the playoffs after winning the AFC South in 2017.

Offseason

Coaching staff changes
After the 2006 season, the Jaguars announced that offensive coordinator Carl Smith, special teams coordinator Pete Rodriguez, quarterbacks coach Ken Anderson, and wide receivers coach Steve Walters would not be returning. Along with these, special teams assistant Mark Michaels' contract had expired and would not be renewed. When hiring, Del Rio created a new position on the staff, assistant wide receivers coach, and so needed to fill six positions. By early February he completed the staff with Dirk Koetter as offensive coordinator, Mike Shula as quarterbacks coach, Todd Monken as wide receivers coach, Robert Prince as wide receivers assistant, Joe DeCamillis as special teams coordinator, and Tom Williams as special teams assistant. Along with the new staff, assistant head coach Mike Tice will take over coaching of the tight ends.

Departures
After a number of player arrests from the end of 2006 season, cornerback Ahmad Carroll, who was signed by the Jaguars in October after being waived by the Green Bay Packers and played in only one game with the Jaguars, was arrested in May on weapons and drug charges, prompting the Jaguars to release him. Also, in a move that shocked even the Jaguars players, nine-year veteran strong safety Donovin Darius was released.

On August 31, 2007 Jaguars coach Jack Del Rio announced in a press conference that Byron Leftwich would be traded or released within the next 72 hours, and that David Garrard would take over the starting duties. The specific reasons were not disclosed. Del Rio was quoted as saying that he "felt a conviction in his heart that Garrard was the guy for the job and he's earned it". The Jaguars released 19 players, traded one player, and placed two players on injured reserve to meet the 53 man roster requirements for the beginning of the season. Byron Leftwich, Dan Connolly, Jamaal Fudge, Nick Greisen, Seth Payne, Charles Sharon, Bruce Thornton, Dee Webb, Josh Gattis, Joe Anoa'i, Kevis Coley, Walter Curry, Ryan Gibbons, Tyler King, Jamar Landrom, Roy Manning, Pete McMahon, Rashod Moulton, and Isaac Smolko were released. Alvin Pearman was traded to the Seattle Seahawks for an undisclosed draft choice. James Wyche and Mike Walker were placed on injured reserve for injuries to groin and knee respectively.

Signings
The off-season brought the arrival of seven free agents to the Jaguars. On offense, offensive tackle Tony Pashos and tight ends Jermaine Wiggins, Richard Angulo and Isaac Smolko were signed. On defense, safety Kevin McCadam and cornerback Bruce Thornton. Additionally, first-year punter Tony Yelk was signed to the special teams.

In addition to the new signings to the team, Tony Gilbert, Derrick Wimbush, Kenny Pettway, Quinn Gray Ernest Wilford and Josh Scobee signed contracts and unrestricted free agent LaBrandon Toefield re-signed.

Draft

Personnel

Staff

Final roster

Preseason

Schedule
The Jacksonville Jaguars pre-season schedule was announced on April 11, 2007.

Regular season
In addition to their regular games with AFC South division rivals, the Jaguars played games against the NFC South and AFC West in accordance with the NFL’s scheduling formula established in 2002. The Jaguars also played games against the Bills and the Steelers based on finishing positions from 2006.

Schedule

Note: Intra-division opponents are in bold text.

Standings

Week 1: vs. Tennessee Titans

Week 2: vs. Atlanta Falcons

Week 3: at Denver Broncos

Week 5: at Kansas City Chiefs

Week 6: vs. Houston Texans

Week 7: vs. Indianapolis Colts

Week 8: at Tampa Bay Buccaneers

Week 9: at New Orleans Saints

Week 10: at Tennessee Titans

Week 11 vs Chargers

Week 12: vs. Buffalo Bills

Week 13: at Indianapolis Colts

Week 14: vs. Carolina Panthers

Week 15: at Pittsburgh Steelers

Week 16: vs. Oakland Raiders

Week 17: at Houston Texans

Postseason

Schedule

AFC Wild Card Playoffs: at (4) Pittsburgh Steelers

Jacksonville gained only 239 yards of offense, but still managed to win on Josh Scobee's 25-yard field goal with 37 seconds left in the game. The Jaguars defense sacked Steelers quarterback Ben Roethlisberger six times, intercepted three of his passes, and forced him to lose a fumble on the final drive of the game.

Pittsburgh opened up the scoring by marching 80 yards in 10 plays on their first drive and finishing it off with Najeh Davenport's 1-yard touchdown run. But Jaguars running back Maurice Jones-Drew returned the ensuing kickoff 96 yards to the 1-yard line (the longest play in NFL postseason history that did not result in a touchdown), and Fred Taylor scored a 1-yard touchdown run on the next play.

Early in the second quarter, Jacksonville defensive back Rashean Mathis intercepted pass from Roethlisberger and returned it 63 yards for a touchdown. Then shortly after the kickoff, Mathis intercepted another pass at the Steelers 46-yard line, setting up David Garrard's 43-yard touchdown pass to Jones-Drew and making the score 21–7. Later in the second quarter, the Steelers took advantage of a missed Scobee field goal by driving all the way to the Jaguars 21-yard line. But defensive tackle Derek Landri intercepted a short pass from Roethlisberger, and the score remained 21–7 at halftime.

In the second half, the Steelers scored on their first four drives. Three plays after the opening kickoff, linebacker James Farrior's interception of a Garrard pass set up Jeff Reed's 28-yard field goal. Jacksonville responded by driving 82 yards in 8 plays, with Garrard rushing for 15 yards and completing two passes to Ernest Wilford for 39, while Jones-Drew capped the drive with a 10-yard touchdown run, increasing their lead to 28–10. But the Steelers drove right back, and on the first play of the fourth quarter, facing fourth down and 12 on the Jags 37-yard line, Roethlisberger threw a 37-yard touchdown pass to Santonio Holmes. Then after a punt, Roethlisberger completed six passes for 65 yards on a 69-yard drive that ended with his 14-yard touchdown pass to Heath Miller. The Steelers attempted a two-point conversion to cut the lead to three points, and Rothlisberger initially completed a pass to Hines Ward, but the play was nullified by a holding penalty and Pittsburgh's second attempt was incomplete, keeping the score at 28–23.

Three plays after the ensuing kickoff, Steelers defensive back Ike Taylor intercepted a pass from Garrard and returned it 31 yards to the Jacksonville 16-yard line. Following a pass interference penalty against the Jaguars in the end zone on a fourth down play, Davenport scored his second 1-yard touchdown run of the day. The two-point conversion failed again, but the Steelers took the lead, 29–28.

Jacksonville was unable to score on their next drive, but they forced the Steelers to punt after three plays and Dennis Northcutt returned the punt 16 yards, giving the Jaguars the ball at their own 49-yard line with 1 timeout remaining and 2:38 left to play. Three plays later on fourth down and 2, Garrard dropped back to pass, but then ran back to the line and took off for a 32-yard burst to the Steelers 11-yard line. After a few more running plays, Scobee kicked a 25-yard field goal, giving his team a 31–29 lead. The Steelers got the ball back with 37 seconds left, but Jaguars defensive end Bobby McCray sealed the victory by forcing a fumble which was recovered by defensive tackle Derek Landri.

With the win, the Jaguars improved their overall record to 12–5.

AFC Divisional Playoffs: at (1) New England Patriots

Patriots quarterback Tom Brady set the NFL record for completion percentage in a single game (92.9%) with 26 of 28 completions for 263 yards and 3 touchdowns, while running back Laurence Maroney added 162 total yards (122 on the ground). Overall, New England gained 401 yards and didn't punt the ball until 31 seconds remained in the fourth quarter.

Jacksonville took the opening kickoff and went 80 yards in 9 plays, featuring two receptions by Marcedes Lewis for 57 yards, on the way to David Garrard's 9-yard touchdown pass to Matt Jones. The Patriots then went on a 74-yard drive and scored with Tom Brady's 3-yard touchdown pass to Benjamin Watson. On Jacksonville's next possession, New England lineman Ty Warren forced a fumble while sacking Garrard, and linebacker Mike Vrabel recovered it at the Jaguars 29-yard line. Several plays later, Maroney scored a 1-yard touchdown run to give New England a 14–7 lead.

Jaguars running back Maurice Jones-Drew muffed the ensuing kickoff and was downed at his own 5-yard line. The Jaguars then moved the ball 95 yards in 11 plays without even facing a third down and scoring with Garrard's 6-yard touchdown pass to Ernest Wilford. For the third time in a row, New England drove deep into Jacksonville territory. But this time the drive stalled at the 17-yard line and ended with no points when Stephen Gostkowski missed a 35-yard field goal with 53 seconds left in the first half.

On the opening drive of the second half, Brady completed 7 of 8 passes for 54 yards on an 82-yard drive. On the last play, he took a snap in shotgun formation with Kevin Faulk to his right, Brady jumped in the air with his arms raised to make it look like a play used by the Patriots before where Faulk took the direct snap. The Jaguars defense followed Faulk, leaving Wes Welker open in the end zone, and Brady threw him the ball for a touchdown to give the Patriots a 21–14 lead. The play has been referred to as the "Statue of Liberty". Jacksonville responded with a drive to the New England 21-yard line, but receiver Dennis Northcutt dropped a pass on third down, forcing them to settle for a Josh Scobee 39-yard field goal, cutting the score to 21–17. On New England's next drive, Jacksonville's Derek Landri was assessed a roughing-the-passer penalty, turning Welker's 6-yard catch into a 21-yard gain. Maroney gained 40 yards with his next two carries, and following two more Welker receptions, Brady threw a 9-yard touchdown pass to Watson giving New England a 28–17 lead.

An unnecessary roughness penalty and a 25-yard reception by Reggie Williams on the Jacksonville's next drive set up a 25-yard field goal by Scobee, which cut the Jaguars deficit to one touchdown, 28–20. On the second play after the kickoff, Brady completed a 52-yard strike to Donté Stallworth, setting up Gostkowski's second field goal attempt to put New England back up by two scores, 31–20.

Then, with 3:46 left in the game, Patriots safety, Rodney Harrison, intercepted a pass from Garrard at the Patriots' 31-yard line, ending any hope of a Jacksonville comeback. Harrison's interception was his 7th career postseason pick, a Patriots record. This was also his fourth consecutive postseason game with an interception, tying an NFL record held by Aeneas Williams.

With this win, the Patriots advanced to the AFC title game for the second year in a row and extended their perfect record to 17–0, matching the final record of the 1972 Miami Dolphins.  The Jaguars' overall record ended with a 12–6 and 1–1 in the playoffs.

References

Jacksonville
Jacksonville Jaguars seasons
Jackson